Club Deportivo Villarrobledo was a Spanish football club based in Villarrobledo, Albacete, in the autonomous community of Castile-La Mancha.

History
Founded in 1956 under the name of Villarrobledo Fútbol Jogadores, the club played two seasons before achieving promotion to Tercera División. It subsequently changed name to Club Deportivo Villarrobledo, and promoted to Segunda División in 1961.

After suffering immediate relegation, the club went on to play six more campaigns before folding. In 1971, CP Villarrobledo was founded and took CD Villarrobledo's colours and crest.

Season to season

1 season in Segunda División
9 seasons in Tercera División

External links
BDFutbol team profile
ArefePedia team profile 

Defunct football clubs in Castilla–La Mancha
Association football clubs established in 1956
Association football clubs disestablished in 1968
1958 establishments in Spain
Villarrobledo